Muhammad Niaz Khan (21 August 1917 – 19 October 2001) was a Pakistani field hockey player. He competed at the 1948 Summer Olympics and the 1952 Summer Olympics.

References

External links
 

1917 births
2001 deaths
Pakistani male field hockey players
Olympic field hockey players of Pakistan
Field hockey players at the 1948 Summer Olympics
Field hockey players at the 1952 Summer Olympics
Field hockey players from Jalandhar
Indian emigrants to Pakistan